Bactobolin is a cytotoxic, polyketide-peptide and antitumor antibiotic with the molecular formula C14H20Cl2N2O6. Bactobolin was discovered in 1979.

References

Further reading 

 
 
 

Organochlorides
Amides
Amines
Lactones
Polyketide antibiotics